Nachum Zev (Velvel) Dessler (1921 – January 23, 2011) was an Orthodox Jewish rabbi as well as founder and dean of the Hebrew Academy of Cleveland.

Dessler was also instrumental in building the National Society for Hebrew Day Schools.

Personal life
Dessler was born in 1921 in Kelm to Rabbi Eliyahu Eliezer and Bluma Dessler. His mother, Bluma, was a granddaughter to Rabbi Simcha Zissel Ziv and Dessler was named after Rabbi Simcha Zissel Ziv's son. In 1929, the family moved to London and Dessler was sent to Yeshivah Etz Chaim. Three years later, he returned to Wilkomir in Lithuania to learn.

References

1921 births
2011 deaths
American Orthodox rabbis
Jewish educators
20th-century American rabbis
21st-century American Jews